B3 is an oil and gas field in the Baltic sea. The field is located 80 km off the Polish coastal town Rozewie.  The crude oil is also referred to as Rozewie crude.  The API gravity of the crude is 42-43 and sulfur content of 0.12 wt%.  The jack up rig Baltic Beta located on the field takes care of processing, drilling and accommodation. The associated gas is sent through a pipeline to the heat and power generating plant in Wladyslawowo.  Most of the oil produced from B3 is shipped by tanker to Gdansk and fed to the Gdańsk refinery as a small part of the refinery feedstock.

External links 
 Facts about B3 and other Polish oil and gas fields
 Facts about Polish oil and gas resources
 Facts about B3 processing and gas export

Energy in Poland
Natural gas fields in Poland
Oil fields of Poland